The Mandschurosaurus (meaning "lizard from Manchuria") are an extinct genus of hadrosaurids based on material from the Late Cretaceous of China and possibly also the Early Cretaceous of Laos. It was the first dinosaur genus named from China, and a mounted skeleton based on the holotype of M. amurensis is on display at the Central Geological and Prospecting Museum in St. Petersburg; however, much of the skeleton is plaster.

Discovery and naming
The holotype of M. amurensis (IVP AS coll.), the only valid species within the genus, is based on a poorly preserved and incomplete skeleton collected by Russian scientists in 1914 from the banks of the Amur River, China in a layer of the Maastrichtian-aged Yuliangze Formation and the remains represent a large hadrosaurid. The holotype material was initially referred to the genus "Trachodon" (a nomen dubium) as T. amurense by Riabinin (1925), but was later reassigned to a new genus by Riabinin (1930). The holotype of M. laosensis, which is based mainly on an ilium and other fragmentary remains, comes from the Aptian-Albian-aged Grès supérieurs Formation in Laos and was named by Hoffet (1944).

Description

Classification
There has been some debate regarding the validity of this genus. Brett-Surman (1979) first considered it a nomen dubium, though some later workers have continued to see it as a valid taxon (Chapman et Brett Surman, 1990, for example). Most recently, Horner et al. (2004) listed the type species as a nomen dubium in the second edition of The Dinosauria.

Over the years, three species have been placed within this genus: Mandschurosaurus amurensis, M. mongoliensis, and M. laosensis. Brett-Surman (1979) considered M. mongoliensis a distinct genus, which he named Gilmoreosaurus and Horner et al. (2004) considered  M. laosensis a nomen dubium; This leaves only Riabinin's original species, M. amurensis, as a possibly valid taxon.

Within Ornithopoda, Mandschurosaurus is most often placed within Hadrosauridae as a nomen dubium.

Gallery

See also

 Timeline of hadrosaur research

References

Late Cretaceous dinosaurs of Asia
Hadrosaurs
Fossil taxa described in 1930
Ornithischian genera